Ahmad Hayel Ibrahim Arshidat (born October 30, 1983) is a Jordanian professional football coach and former player who played as a striker.
 
Hayel is married and has two children that are twins, a son named Jad and a daughter named Natali.

Career

Al-Arabi
1st Viva Team of the week

International career
Hayel played his first match with his national team Jordan against Cyprus in an international friendly at Amman on 26 March 2005 which resulted in a 2-1 loss for Jordan.

He was selected in Jordan's squad at the 2015 AFC Asian Cup. During a doping test, he was required to drink so much water to produce a urine sample, that he developed hypothermia and was rendered unconscious.

International goals
Scores and results list Jordan's goal tally first.

Honours

Al-Arabi
Kuwait Super Cup:1
 2012
Kuwait Federation Cup:1
 2013-14 
Kuwait Crown Prince Cup:1
2014-15

iIndividual records
 Top Goalscorer Kuwait Crown Prince Cup 2012-13 (4 goals)2014-15 ( 3 goals)
Top Goalscorer Jordan Premier League 2011-12 (18 goals)
Top Goalscorer of Al-Arabi SC 2012-13' (20 goals) 2013-14''' (20 goals)

References

External links
 
 

1983 births
Living people
Jordanian footballers
Jordan international footballers
Association football forwards
Jordanian expatriate footballers
Expatriate footballers in Syria
Expatriate footballers in Kuwait
Expatriate footballers in the United Arab Emirates
Jordanian expatriate sportspeople in Kuwait
Jordanian expatriate sportspeople in Syria
2015 AFC Asian Cup players
Al-Ramtha SC players
Al-Jazeera (Jordan) players
Al-Faisaly SC players
Al-Arabi SC (Kuwait) players
Al-Jaish Damascus players
Fujairah FC players
Jordanian Pro League players
UAE First Division League players
Syrian Premier League players
Kuwait Premier League players
Jordanian football managers
Jordan national football team managers